Undina (from Latin Undīna), minor planet designation 92 Undina, is a large main belt asteroid. The asteroid was discovered by Christian Peters on 7 July 1867 from the Hamilton College Observatory. It is named for the eponymous heroine of Undine, a popular novella by Friedrich de la Motte Fouqué.

This minor planet is orbiting at a distance of around 3 AU from the Sun, which is known for a concentration of Tholen M-type asteroids. Indeed, 92 Undina has an unusually high albedo of 0.25 and an M-type spectrum, or Xc-type on the Bus taxonomy. However, it displays absorption features at a wavelength of 3 μm, which is usually indicative of hydrated silicates on the surface. There is a faint band in the region of 9 μm that is typically attributed to a form of orthopyroxene having low levels of calcium and iron. The spectrum of 92 Undina closely resembles powdered material from the Esquel meteorite, although with a higher albedo.

Observations performed at the Palmer Divide Observatory in Colorado Springs, Colorado during 2007 produced a light curve with a period of 15.941 ± 0.002 hours with a brightness range of 0.20 ± 0.02 in magnitude. This matches a 15.94-hour period reported in 1979. Attempts in 2014 to model the spin axis and shape based on light curve information proved inconclusive, but did indicate that "the pole latitude is not far removed from the ecliptic plane and rotation is probably retrograde".

References

External links 
 Lightcurve plot of 92 Undina, Palmer Divide Observatory, B. D. Warner (2011)
 Asteroid Lightcurve Database (LCDB), query form (info )
 Dictionary of Minor Planet Names, Google books
 Asteroids and comets rotation curves, CdR – Observatoire de Genève, Raoul Behrend
 Discovery Circumstances: Numbered Minor Planets (1)-(5000) – Minor Planet Center
 
 

000092
Discoveries by Christian Peters
Named minor planets
000092
000092
18670707